Pierre René Hubert Marie van der Linden (born 14 December 1943) is a retired Dutch politician and diplomat of the Catholic People's Party (KVP) and later the Christian Democratic Appeal (CDA) party and economist.

Van der Linden applied at the Catholic University Brabant in June 1964 majoring in Economics and obtaining a Bachelor of Economics degree in June 1966 and worked as student researcher before graduating with a Master of Economics degree in July 1970. Van der Linden worked as an economics teacher in Tilburg from April 1969 until July 1971. Van der Linden worked as a civil servant for the department of Food Quality of the Ministry of Agriculture and Fisheries from July 1971 until January 1973 and served as Chief of staff for the European Commissioner of the Netherlands from January 1973 until January 1977 serving under Pierre Lardinois from January 1973 until January 1977 and for Henk Vredeling from January 1977 until June 1977.

Van der Linden was elected as a Member of the House of Representatives after the election of 1977, taking office on 8 June 1977 serving as a frontbencher and spokesperson for European Affairs and Agriculture and deputy spokesperson for Foreign Affairs and Benelux. After the election of 1986 Van der Linden was appointed as State Secretary for Foreign Affairs in the Cabinet Lubbers II, taking office on 14 July 1986. On 9 September 1988 Van der Linden resigned following the conclusions of a parliamentary inquiry report into a passport fraud investigation that was mishandled by his predecessor as State Secretary for Foreign Affairs Wim van Eekelen who was then serving as Minister of Defence and who had resigned four days earlier on 6 September 1988. Van der Linden returned as a Member of the House of Representatives following the appointment of Jeltien Kraaijeveld-Wouters as Mayor of Hilversum, taking office on 29 November 1988 serving again as a frontbencher chairing the parliamentary committee for Foreign Affairs and spokesperson for Foreign Affairs, European Affairs, Agriculture and Benelux. In December 1997 Van der Linden announced that he wouldn't stand for the election of 1998 and continued to serve until the end of the parliamentary term on 19 May 1998. Van der Linden remained in active in national politics, he was elected as a Member of the Senate after the Senate election of 1999, taking office on 8 June 1999 serving as a frontbencher chairing the parliamentary committee for European Affairs and spokesperson for Foreign Affairs and deputy spokesperson for Agriculture and Benelux. Van der Linden also served as President of the Parliamentary Assembly of the Council of Europe from 1 January 2005 until 1 January 2008. Van der Linden also became active in the private sector and public sector and occupied numerous seats as a corporate director and nonprofit director on several boards of directors and supervisory boards (Atlantic Association, Robeco, Oxfam Novib, Trilateral Commission, Akkerbouw, Van Lanschot and Institute of International Relations Clingendael). Van der Linden also worked as a trade association executive for the Industry and Employers confederation (VNO-NCW) and as an education administrator for the Maastricht School of Management serving as Chairman of the Education board from October 1999 until November 2016. Van der Linden was nominated as President of the Senate following the appointed of Yvonne Timmerman-Buck as a Member of the Council of State, serving from 6 October 2009 until 28 June 2011. In November 2014 Van der Linden announced that he wouldn't stand for the Senate election of 2015 and continued to serve until the end of the parliamentary term on 9 June 2015.

Education 
Economics: international administrative studies at 
Catholic Economics Faculty in Tilburg, (1966–1970), (now known as Tilburg University)

Career 
Member of the First Chamber (Senate) of the States-General of the Netherlands (1999–2015)
President of the First Chamber (Senate) of the States-General of the Netherlands (from 2009 until 2011)
President of the Committee for European cooperation of the First Chamber of the States-General (from 2002 to 2009)
Member of the Second Chamber of the States-General of the Netherlands (1977–1986 and 1988–1998)
Secretary of State for Foreign Affairs with responsibility for European Affairs (1986–1988)
Member of the cabinet of European Commissioner Pierre Lardinois (1973–1977) and European Commissioner Henk Vredeling (1977)
Civil servant, Ministry of Agriculture and Fisheries of the Netherlands (1971–1973)
Teacher of economics (1969)

Other posts currently held 
Council of Europe Parliamentary Assembly (PACE) member (since 1989)
Member of the Parliamentary Assembly of the Western European Union (WEU)
Member of the executive board of the Dutch employers’ confederation
Board member of Kerk en Nood (Church and Need)
Chairman of the Maastricht School of Management (since 1999)
Board member of several associations in the agricultural sector

Party political posts 
Chairperson of EPP/CD group in the Council of Europe Parliamentary Assembly (PACE) (1999–2005) and vice-chairperson (1989–1999)
Second vice-chairperson of the Christian Democratic political group, CDA, Second Chamber of the States-General of the Netherlands (1982–1986)
Member of the party executive of the CDA
Member of the party executive of the former Catholic Popular Party, (KVP), and vice-chairman of the KVP youth section

Other posts previously held 
President of the Parliamentary Assembly of the Council of Europe (2005–2008)
Chairperson of the Netherlands delegation to PACE (2003–2005)
Delegated representative of the First Chamber of the States-General of the Netherlands to the Convention on the Future of the European Union
Patron of Stichting Lisboa, homeless children in Portugal (1995)
Chairman of the advisory committee of the national school of translators and interpreters, Rijkshogeschool Opleiding tolk-vertaler (1990)
Adviser to Combined Chambers of Commerce in Limburg (1989 and 1992)
Member of Consultative Interparliamentary Benelux Council (1977–1986)
Board member of the Netherlands Organisation for international assistance, NOVIB,
President of several cultural foundations

Van der Linden was secretary of state of foreign affairs in the Dutch cabinet Lubbers II. He was responsible for the passport fiasco which was caused by ministerial incompetence.

Controversies

Controversial claims about citizenship issues in Baltic Countries 

During a press conference in Tallinn on 19 September 2007, a controversy ensued when Linden accused Estonia of not permitting non-citizen residents to take part in local elections. Former Prime Minister of Estonia Mart Laar attempted to correct him, pointing out that all permanent residents in Estonia have the right to vote (but not to be elected) in local elections. However van der Linden referred to reports of the Amnesty International and other human rights organizations.

In reaction, the Estonian Social Democratic Party issued a statement calling that van der Linden be immediately dismissed from his post.  Admitting that Linden's term of office is due to end in late 2007 anyway, the statement declared that he had with his inaccurate comments disqualified himself.

On 2 October 2007, speaker of Estonian Parliament, Ene Ergma, sent a strongly worded open letter to van der Linden, asking him to do his homework and "give up spreading erroneous information about Estonia", which "created confusion and bewilderment both in the Estonian public and internationally." In his reply, van der Linden expressed amazement at the content of the letter and the fact that Ene Ergma made accusations public before giving him any right of reply. He also pointed out that Ene Ergma never expressed such views to him during their meeting, which took place less than two weeks before.

Later that month, in a press conference in Lithuania, he claimed that millions of people live without status in the Baltic countries. The population of Estonia is roughly 1,342,000, of which roughly 8.5% are without defined citizenship.

Alleged financial interest in Russia 
In August 2007, van der Linden became embroiled in controversy after articles in the Eesti Päevaleht suggested that van der Linden's family had business interests in Russia.  This is suspected to explain his lack of criticism towards Putin and the Russian government for human rights violations and his pro-Russia and anti-Baltic stand, as well as his stand against relocating the Bronze Soldier of Tallinn from central Tallinn.

After a 3 October 2007 phone call from van der Linden, threatening investigation by French police, Marko Mihkelson, chairman of the Estonian parliament's European Union affairs committee, held a press conference on 8 October 2007 where he presented materials collected from various publicly  available Russian media sources in which central topic is van der Linden's role as the head of the supervisory council of a certain Dutch investment company that established the biggest industrial park in Europe in Sobinsk, Russia in late 2006. Subsequently, van der Linden denied all accusations and stated that he never had any financial interest in Russia neither is he serving as mentioned chairman. He was called the head of the supervisory board of Noble House Group at the home page of the Dutch investment company Noble House Trading. However, a representative of Noble House Holding told Estonia's ETV, on 7 October 2007, that van der Linden is not a member of the company's supervisory board and that the supervisory board would be appointed only next year.

Alleged Security Risk due to Russia 

In November 2022 Van der Linden was reported to be monitored and having his phone tapped by the dutch security service AIVD due to his ties to close associates to Vladimir Putin. As such Van der Linden was accused of being a "Russian pawn", having been in close contact with an exposed Russian spy and having traveled in Europe at the expense of Russians.

Decorations

Other honours
Honorary citizen of Nafplio
Honorary citizen of Liège
Honorary President of the Parliamentary Assembly of the Council of Europe
Friendship Award of Azerbaijan Republic 2013

References

External links

Official
  Drs. P.R.H.M. (René) van der Linden Parlement & Politiek
  Drs. P.R.H.M. van der Linden (CDA) Eerste Kamer der Staten-Generaal
 Кремлевский легион Совета Европы

 

 

1943 births
Living people
Catholic People's Party politicians
Van Lanschot Kempen people
Christian Democratic Appeal MEPs
Christian Democratic Appeal politicians
Commanders Crosses of the Order of Merit of the Federal Republic of Germany
Commanders First Class of the Order of the Dannebrog
Commanders of the Order of Isabella the Catholic
Commandeurs of the Légion d'honneur
Dutch corporate directors
Dutch expatriates in Belgium
Dutch lobbyists
Dutch nonprofit directors
Dutch nonprofit executives
Dutch officials of the European Union
Dutch political consultants
Dutch political writers
Dutch Roman Catholics
Dutch school administrators
Dutch speechwriters
Dutch trade association executives
European Union lobbyists
Grand Officers of the Order of Merit of the Italian Republic
Grand Officers of the Order of Orange-Nassau
Knights of St. Gregory the Great
Knights of the Holy Sepulchre
Knights of the Order of the Netherlands Lion
Members of the House of Representatives (Netherlands)
Members of the Parliamentary Assembly of the Council of Europe
Members of the Senate (Netherlands)
Officers of the Order of Leopold II
Officers of the Order of Polonia Restituta
Oxfam people

People from Beekdaelen
People from Gulpen-Wittem
Presidents of the Senate (Netherlands)
Recipients of the Order of the Republic (Turkey)
Recipients of the Presidential Medal of Merit (Philippines)
State Secretaries for Foreign Affairs of the Netherlands
Tilburg University alumni
Academic staff of Tilburg University
Western European Union people
20th-century Dutch civil servants
20th-century Dutch diplomats
20th-century Dutch economists
20th-century Dutch educators
20th-century Dutch male writers
20th-century Dutch politicians
21st-century Dutch civil servants
21st-century Dutch diplomats
21st-century Dutch economists
21st-century Dutch male writers
21st-century Dutch politicians